Lazek may refer to:

Łazek, Poland
Łążek (disambiguation)

See also
Lasek (disambiguation)